Jorge Juan Martín de San Pablo Sánchez de Rojas (born 24 November 1975), known simply as Jorge, is a Spanish former footballer who played as a central defender, and the manager of RSD Alcalá.

Playing career
Born in Toledo, Castile-La Mancha, Jorge spent most of his senior career, which spanned 16 seasons, in Segunda División B and Tercera División. In 2005, he signed for CD Guadalajara in the former level, where he remained until his retirement seven years later.

Jorge contributed with 33 games in the 2010–11 campaign – playoffs included – as the side promoted to Segunda División for the first time in their history. On 27 August 2011, aged nearly 36, he played his first match as a professional, a 1–1 home draw against UD Las Palmas in which he featured the full 90 minutes.

Coaching career
Jorge retired at the end of 2011–12, after totalling 992 minutes of action to help Guadalajara retain their league status. He continued linked to the club in the following years, as an assistant general manager, youth coach and assistant to the first team.

References

External links

1975 births
Living people
Sportspeople from Toledo, Spain
Spanish footballers
Footballers from Castilla–La Mancha
Association football defenders
Segunda División players
Segunda División B players
Tercera División players
Yeclano CF players
CD Mensajero players
CD Toledo players
CD Guadalajara (Spain) footballers
Spanish football managers
Tercera División managers